The Alliance of Queer and Ally Students is a student organization for LGBT and straight ally students of Michigan State University. One of the oldest Lesbian, Gay, Bisexual and Transgender groups in Michigan, it began in the early 1970s. First dubbed the Michigan State Gay Liberation Movement (GLM), some sources state the organization began in 1970, while others state it began in 1972.

On March 7, 1972, the city council of  East Lansing, Michigan passed an LGBT anti-discrimination ordinance, something the GLM had been pushing for. Since then, the group has advocated for policy changes on campus, such as policies around preferred names, gender neutral housing, and gender neutral bathrooms.

About

Mission Statement 
On the home page of the Alliance’s website, listed below, they provided their mission statement which reads, “The purpose of the Alliance shall be to advocate for and assist in the maintenance of the equality of all groups of Students at Michigan State University that are discriminated against on the basis of gender identity and/or sexual orientation. We recognize and believe that all forms of oppression are connected and act as barriers to personal and academic success, and are committed to working with other student groups to fight oppression in any form. Our mission iis to engage in projects and educational endeavors that will expand the horizons of social, legal, economic, and sexual equality for these Students at Michigan State University.”

Ten Point Plan 
Found on the Alliance’s Twitter page, the group put together a ten-point plan on inclusion of diversity, bettering equality, and inclusion of all students. The list reads:

1. We demand the revitalization of the Office of Cultural & Academic Transitions office, its programming, and the Intercultural Aide program by Fall 2020.

2. We demand a mandatory general education course for all students on race, ethnicity, racism, and gender be implemented into curriculum by Fall 2020.

3. We demand cultural, racial and religious sensitivity training for all University faculty, staff, contractors, and police officers as outlined by a student selected group by Fall 2020.

4. We demand that the Black & Minority faculty and staff demographics in each department reflect the current national demographics by December 2021.

5. We demand that Michigan State University become registered as a sanctuary school.

6. We demand the addition of reflection rooms in all campus neighborhoods.

7. We demand that a freestanding multicultural building be placed on campus.

8. We demand that Michigan State University increase the number of gender inclusive housing options and restrooms on campus by 75% by the start of the Fall 2020 semester.

9. We demand that the flat-rate tuition price be dropped to the price of 12 credit hours by the start of the Winter 2020 semester.

10. We demand that Student Affairs create a designated fund for the Council of Progressive Students (COPS).

History 
When first registered as a student organization, they named themselves the Michigan State University Gay Liberation Movement. Members changed the name in 1997 to MSU Gay Liberation Council. The name then changed to the MSU Lesbian/Gay Council, then again to the Alliance of Lesbian-Bi-Gay Students. By 2005, the group became the Alliance of Lesbian, Bisexual, Gay, Transgendered, and Straight Ally Students. They adopted Alliance of Queer and Ally Students in 2010.

Engagement with Civil Rights 
The group has a history with its members engaging in protests and coming into conflict with local and University authorities over LGBT rights. Tim Retzloff once conducted several oral history recordings, and stated later that the MSU GLM had participated in protests against the Vietnam War. These recorded interviews were with people who had been active in Michigan’s historical gay liberation actions and organizations. One man interviewed, Leonard Graff, talked about a blockade formed on the intersection of Grand River and Michigan “for days”. The recordings also revealed that MSU had once barred the GLM from hanging a banner on a local street for Gay Pride Week.

First Anti-Discriminatory Ordinance 
On March 7, 1972, the city council of East Lansing, Michigan, passed an ordinance against discrimination based on sexual orientation when hiring employees, stating that they would hire the best applicant to fill the job, “without regard to race, color, creed, national origin, sex or homosexuality.”

Notable Members 
Don Gaudard - A member of the GLM in 1994, he helped to put a stop to traffic on the intersection of Grand River and Michigan by pretending to drop his contact lens.

Leonard Graff – Was interviewed, gave a history of the blockade formed to protest American involvement in the Vietnam war.

Tim Retzloff – Currently teaching history and LGBTQ studies at Michigan University, interviewed and recorded several past members of the GLM.

Current Eboard 
Chairperson – Mady Gildea

Vice Chairperson – Sean Wolski

Office Manager – Emily Pelky

ASMSU Representative – Colin Wiebrecht

RHA Representative – Katrine Weismantle

Public Relations Coordinator – Sydney Cronkhite

Conference Coordinator – Jenna B.

References

External links
 Facebook Page
Website 
Twitter

LGBT youth organizations based in the United States
Michigan State University
Queer organizations
LGBT in Michigan